General Servando Canales International Airport, also known as Matamoros International Airport, is an international airport located in Matamoros, Tamaulipas, Mexico, near the U.S.-Mexico border. It handles national and international air traffic for the city of Matamoros. It is operated by Aeropuertos y Servicios Auxiliares, a federal government-owned corporation.

In 2021, the airport handled 49,422	passengers, and in 2022 it handled 50,530 passengers.

Airlines and destinations

Statistics

Passengers

See also 

 List of the busiest airports in Mexico

References

External links
 Matamoros International Airport

Airports in Tamaulipas
Matamoros, Tamaulipas